Bolonino is a rural locality in Soldatsky Selsoviet Rural Settlement, Fatezhsky District, Kursk Oblast, Russia.

Geography 
The village is located on the Usozha River (a left tributary of the Svapa in the basin of the Seym), 93 km from the Russia–Ukraine border, 49 km north-west of Kursk, 10 km south-west of the district center – the town Fatezh, 2.5 km from the selsoviet center – Soldatskoye.

Climate and Population 
Bolonino has a warm-summer humid continental climate (Dfb in the Köppen climate classification).

Population:

Transport 
Bolonino is located 8 km from the federal route  Crimea Highway as part of the European route E105, 4 km from the road of regional importance  (Fatezh – Dmitriyev), 1 km from the road of intermunicipal significance  (38K-038 – Soldatskoye – Shuklino), 26.5 km from the nearest railway halt 29 km (railway line Arbuzovo – Luzhki-Orlovskiye).

The rural locality is situated 53 km from Kursk Vostochny Airport, 168 km from Belgorod International Airport and 244 km from Voronezh Peter the Great Airport.

References

Notes

Sources

Rural localities in Fatezhsky District